Isaabad (also Romanized as ‘Īsáābād and Īsābād) is a village in Khurheh Rural District, in the Central District of Mahallat County, Markazi Province, Iran. At the 2006 census, its population was 194, in 53 families.

References 

Populated places in Mahallat County